The Serbian National American Football Team is the official American football senior national team of Serbia. They are organized by the Srpska asocijacija američkog fudbala (SAAF). They get their players from teams of the Central European Football League.

European Championships
Serbia competed in European Championship B division along with Czech Republic, Great Britain and Italy. In 2012, Serbia won the European Championship C Division after beating Switzerland in the final and advanced to the B division. In 2013, Serbia won 5th place in the European Championship B division after beating Spain 30–0.

In 2015, Serbia played in the European Championship of American football, which France won in 2018. In the first round, Serbia won against Hungary 56-0 and qualified for the second round tournament in Italy. In the semifinals, Serbia recorded a win over Switzerland 17-0 but lost in the final match against the host Italy 14–17.

In 2019, IFAF created a new biyearly cycle. Serbia was placed in Group A - Division A with France and the Czech Republic. On October 27th Serbia defeated Czech Republic 16–00 at home in the city of Pozarevac. On November 9th against European champions France in Lille Serbia played a great game but eventually lost 7–13 and missed a chance to qualify for the final tournament.

In 2020, Serbia was scheduled to play against Austria and, depending on results, another game against either Great Britain or Denmark. However, due to the outbreak of virus Covid-19 these matches are in doubt and could be rescheduled.

Roster

Squad for 2019 European Championship matches against Czech Republic and France:

See also 
 Nacionalna Liga Srbije
 Central European Football League
 EFAF European Championship

References

External links
Official website at SAAF.

Serbia
American football in Serbia
American Football
2003 establishments in Serbia
American football teams established in 2003